Hænning is a surname. Notable people with the surname include:
 
Gitte Hænning (born 1946), Danish singer and actress
Otto Hænning (1916–2004), Danish composer and guitarist
 

Danish-language surnames